Census Division No. 18 (North Interlake) is a census division located within the Interlake Region of the province of Manitoba, Canada. Unlike in some other provinces, census divisions do not reflect the organization of local government in Manitoba. These areas exist solely for the purposes of statistical analysis and presentation; they have no government of their own.

The economy of the region is based on agriculture, livestock and manufacturing. The population of the area as of the 2006 census was 23,861. The division contains all of the south basin of Lake Manitoba, and borders the west shore of the north basin (which is part of Division No. 19). It also contains Hecla-Grindstone Provincial Park at its northeast corner. Also included in the division are the main reserves of the Lake Manitoba First Nation (Dog Creek 46), the Little Saskatchewan First Nation, and the Pinaymootang First Nation (Fairford 50).

Demographics 

Towns
 Arborg
 Winnipeg Beach

Unincorporated communities

 Gimli
 Riverton

Municipalities

 Armstrong
 Bifrost – Riverton
 Coldwell
 Fisher
 Gimli
 Grahamdale
 St. Laurent
 West Interlake

Reserves
 Dog Creek 46
 Fairfield 50 (part)
 Little Saskatchewan 48

References

External links
 Manitoba CDommunity Profiles: North Interlake 

18